戰國時代, 战国时代, or 戦国時代 may refer to:
Warring States period in Chinese history
Sengoku period in Japanese history